Chloe Beck (born August 30, 2001) is an American tennis player.

Beck won the 2019 Junior French Open Doubles Championship with Emma Navarro, and they also finished runners-up in the 2019 Junior Australian Open Championship. Beck has reached a career-high doubles ranking by the WTA of 400. She made her WTA Tour main-draw debut at the 2019 Charleston Open, partnering with Emma Navarro, after the pair received a wildcard into the main draw of the doubles tournament. Beck is playing college tennis at Duke University.

Junior Grand Slam finals

Girls' doubles

ITF finals

Doubles (1-0)

References

External links
 
 

American female tennis players
French Open junior champions
Tennis people from Georgia (U.S. state)
Duke Blue Devils women's tennis players
Living people
2001 births
Grand Slam (tennis) champions in girls' doubles